Caballero (plural: Caballeros), the Spanish word for knight or gentleman, is used as a form of address for older gentlemen and may refer to:

Places
 Caballero, Coclé, Panama
 Pedro Juan Caballero, Paraguay, a city
 Santiago de los Caballeros, a city in the Dominican Republic

People
 Caballero (surname), people with the surname Caballero
 Caballero Apache chief; see Nana (chief)
 "Los Cabelleros de Cali" ("Gentlemen of Cali"), self-appointed nickname for the four partners who ran the Cali Cartel

Arts, entertainment, and media

Fictional entities
 El Caballero, a Seattle-based superhero associated with the Rain City Superhero Movement
 Guy Caballero, a character on the television series SCTV
 Yellow Caballero, a character in the Pokémon Adventures manga

Music
 Caballero (Arabesque album), a 1981 album by the German disco group Arabesque
 Don Caballero, an instrumental rock group from Pittsburgh, Pennsylvania

Printed works
 Cabellero (magazine), published in Mexico
 Caballero: A Historical Novel, an American novel by Jovita González and Eve Raleigh

Brands and companies
 Caballero (cigarette), a Dutch brand
 Caballero Home Video, an American pornographic film studio
 GMC Caballero, a car/truck hybrid, twin to the Chevrolet El Camino from 1978 to 1987
 Miguel Caballero (company), maker of bulletproof clothing

Sport
 Caballero (cycling team), a Dutch professional cycling team

See also